Rafael "Busta" Quintana is a Cuban former second baseman who played in the Negro leagues in the 1930s.

A native of Cuba, Quintana played for Pollock's Cuban Stars in 1933, and for the Newark Dodgers the following season. In nine recorded career games, he posted seven hits in 38 plate appearances.

References

External links
 and Seamheads

Year of birth missing
Place of birth missing
Newark Dodgers players
Pollock's Cuban Stars players
Cuban baseball players
Baseball second basemen